Çay Rəsullu (also, Çayrəsullu, Chay-Rasullu) is a village and municipality in the Gadabay Rayon of Azerbaijan.  It has a population of 1,239.  The municipality consists of the villages of Çay Rəsullu, Bəydəmirli, Turşsu.

References 

Populated places in Gadabay District